†Zygopleuridae is an extinct family of fossil sea snails, marine gastropod molluscs in the clade Caenogastropoda.

Genera
Genera within the family Zygopleuridae include:
 Zygopleura

References

 The Taxonomicon

 
Prehistoric gastropods
Gastropod families